The Red Lake Indian Reservation (Ojibwe: Miskwaagamiiwi-zaaga'iganing) covers  in parts of nine counties in northwestern Minnesota, United States. 

It is made up of numerous holdings but the largest section is an area about Red Lake, in north-central Minnesota, the largest lake in the state. This section lies primarily in the counties of Beltrami and Clearwater. 

Land in seven other counties is also part of the reservation. The reservation population was 5,506 in the 2020 census.

The second-largest section is much farther north, in the Northwest Angle of Lake of the Woods County near the Canada–United States border.  It has no permanent residents. Between these two largest sections are hundreds of mostly small, non-contiguous reservation exclaves in the counties of Beltrami, Clearwater, Lake of the Woods, Koochiching, Roseau, Pennington, Marshall, Red Lake, and Polk.

Home to the federally recognized Red Lake Band of Chippewa, it is unique as the only "closed reservation" in Minnesota. In a closed reservation, all land is held in common by the tribe and there is no private property.  

The tribe claims the land by right of conquest and aboriginal title; they were not reassigned to it by the United States government. The Red Lake Band of Chippewa refused to join with six other bands in organizing as the Minnesota Chippewa Tribe in the mid-1930s; at the time, its people wanted to preserve their traditional system of hereditary chiefs, rather than forming an electoral government.

As of 2011, the Ojibwe language is the official language of Red Lake.  Seven principal clans (doodems) found on the Red Lake Indian Reservation are makwa (bear), mikinaak (turtle), owaazisii (bullhead), nigig (otter), migizi (eagle), waabizheshi (marten), and ogiishkimanisii (kingfisher).  As a population minority name (sturgeon) and adik (caribou) clans are also found.

In the 2000 census, Red Lake was the most populous reservation in the state, with 5,162 residents. The only place in Minnesota with a higher Native American population at that time was the state's largest city, Minneapolis, 250 miles to the south; it recorded 8,378 Indian residents that year. By 2007, the White Earth and Leech Lake reservations (both led by parts of the Minnesota Chippewa Tribe) had higher resident populations of enrolled Ojibwe.

The reservation's largest community is Red Lake, on the south shore of Red Lake. Given the large lake in the heart of the reservation, its total land area of  covers about 70% of the reservation's surface area.

History 

In the 17th century, the Algonquian-speaking Ojibwe migrated into present-day Minnesota from the north around the Great Lakes. Their warriors went ahead of colonizers and were told to clear the way for the Anishinaabe families. Before invading the Mille Lacs region, Ojibwe warriors had forced their way into the region just west of what is now Duluth, Minnesota, on Lake Superior. They established a village known as Wi-yah-kwa-kit-chi-ga-ming. It was later called Fond du Lac (Bottom of the Lake) by French fur traders, the first Europeans to interact with the Ojibwe in this area. From there, Anishinaabe warriors invaded the Sandy Lake and Red Lake regions. Their conquest of the Red Lake region may have occurred between 1650 and 1750. By that time, Anishinaabe people were already living in the Grand Portage, Rainy Lake, and Pembina region of present-day northern Minnesota.

After subjugating the Dakota who lived in the Red Lake region, and forcing many from the area, the Noka (the Military and Police totem of the Anishinaabe) settled in. They eventually allowed other Anishinaabe totems to enter the Red Lake region to live. Most Anishinaabe immigrants to this area were from the Noka totem (or clan). They established many villages in the Red Lake region. Later, they and their Dakota allies invaded the plains of present-day North Dakota, western South Dakota, and Montana. The Western Dakota, who refused to surrender, continued to fight the Anishinaabe-Dakota alliance.  With each battle and defeat, more Dakota asked for peace from the Anishinaabe. The Western Dakota who continued the conflict developed a great hatred for those Eastern Dakota who were allies of the Anishinaabe.

William Whipple Warren, the first historian of the Ojibwe people, noted their longstanding associations with the French Canadians by the mid-18th century, due both to fur trading and intermarriage among their peoples. As a result, the Ojibwe fought with the French during the Seven Years' War against the English; it was known in North America as the French and Indian War. Although the English won the war and took over "French" territory in Canada and east of the Mississippi River, the Ojibwe retained many trading and family associations with ethnic French Canadians.

19th century

In the 1850s two Roman Catholic priests established a mission with the Red Lake band. Later, Catholic nuns from the Benedictine monastery (convent) in St. Joseph founded St. Mary's Mission at Red Lake.  They organized a boarding school at the mission to serve Ojibwe girls, teaching them Christianity and English. Over time, most residents on the reservation adopted Roman Catholicism, although many also retained Ojibwe rituals and traditions, including funeral and mourning practices.

Allied with the Pembina Band of Chippewa Indians, in 1863 the Red Lake Band negotiated the Treaty of Old Crossing in Minnesota with the United States.  They agreed to cede their lands in the Red River and Pembina area. They made additional agreements for land cessions in the following decades, under pressure of increased numbers of European-American settlers in the area.

The United States and Canada surveyed the international border between them to correct previous errors. By the corrected boundaries, the Northwest Angle was included within the United States, together with its historic residents, the Lac du Bois Band of Ojibwa. As they lacked federal recognition from the US Bureau of Indian Affairs, the US consolidated the small Lac du Bois Band administratively with the Red Lake Band.

While the tribe ceded large tracts of land to the US, it maintained a central portion. It resisted US attempts to gain its approval for allotment of communal land to individual households under the Dawes Act of 1887. This involved dividing communal tribal land into individual household plots for farming and private ownership. The US would declare any land remaining on the reservation after allocating 160 acres to each head of household as "surplus" and available for sale to non-Indians.

During this period, some of the Pembina Band of Chippewa Indians, refusing relocation to the Turtle Mountain or the White Earth reservations, escaped to the Red Lake Indian Reservation because it was "untouched Indian land." It had never left tribal control.

On July 8, 1889, the United States told the Minnesota Chippewa that the Red Lake and White Earth reservations would be retained, but the others would be put up for public sale. They said that Chippewa from the other reservations would be relocated to White Earth Reservation. The United States told the leaders of the Chippewa reservations that the members of each reservation could vote on whether to accept allotment at that reservation, with voting to be by all qualified Chippewa men. The Chippewa leaders were outraged.

Red Lake leaders warned the United States about reprisals if their Reservation were violated. The members of the White Earth and Mille Lacs reservations both voted overwhelmingly to accept land allotments and allow the surplus land sold to the whites, with the tribes to receive the lump sums of money from the sales. The Leech Lake Reservation members also voted for land allotments. The October 5, 1898, Battle of Sugar Point was over land.

In 1889, the Red Lake Reservation covered 3,260,000 acres or 5,093 sq. mi. The Band was forced to cede 2,905,000 acres as "surplus" after allotment to households registered on the Dawes Rolls took place.  That left the Reservation with more than 300,000 acres of land and most of Lower and Upper Red Lake. Learning of Chippewa unrest because of the vote, the United States later set aside large areas of forests to add back to the Red Lake Reservation. But, in 1904 US officials returned, and forced the Red Lake Chippewa to cede more land from that set aside in 1889. The present Red Lake Reservation dates to the 1904 land act. There was no allotment of land at that time to individual Chippewa living on the Red Lake Reservation.

Only a small portion of the White Earth Reservation remained. This was the northeast part of the full reservation; it was a fraction of the original territory.  All other Minnesota, Chippewa reservations were closed, with the lands sold off after the Nelson Act of 1889. As a result of the 1898 Rebellion, which occurred on the Leech Lake Reservation, the US changed its policy. It returned some land to Minnesota's remaining Chippewa reservations, including White Earth.

20th century to present

The current Red Lake reservation is entirely owned and occupied by members of the Red Lake Band, making it unique among reservations in Minnesota. (As a result of allotment and sales in the intervening years, some tribes own less than 10% of the land within their reservation boundaries). Red Lake is among the most isolated reservations in the United States. In 1934, after the Indian Reorganization Act that year encouraged tribes to restore their governments, the tribe rejected joining six other Chippewa bands to organize the federally recognized Minnesota Chippewa Tribe under a written constitution. Its leaders did not want to give up the tradition of hereditary chiefs for an elected government or give up any control of its land to the Tribe. By 2007, the Minnesota Chippewa Tribe reported a total enrollment of more than 40,000 members.

In the 1950s, new tribal leaders of Red Lake wrote a constitution to establish democratically elected government of chairman and council, without term limits. The tribe elected its first chairman and tribal council in 1959. Roger Jourdain was repeatedly re-elected and retained power until 1990. Under his leadership, the tribe developed infrastructure on the reservation, including running water, roads, and housing.

The tribe has established a library and archives, and appointed a tribal archaeologist to study and preserve the archaeological artifacts of its people. Tribal schools on the reservation were established so that the children could be educated in their own community through high school.

Red Lake, like the White Earth, and Leech Lake reservations, is known for its tradition of singing hymns in the Ojibwe language.

In part because of the reservation's isolation, it has struggled economically. Many people are unemployed. High unemployment has contributed to high rates of poverty, alcoholism, violence and suicide. As a result, since the 1990s, the school board has added classes to the high school curriculum to include drug and alcohol abuse prevention, anti-gang training, anti-bullying training, and instruction about fetal alcohol syndrome. As a result of gang killings in the 1990s, the school added security measures to the high school, including guards.

The Red Lake Band of the Chippewa are the only entity beside state governments and Pacific dependencies currently eligible for SAMHSA Substance Abuse Prevention and Treatment block grants

Since the mid-20th century, the tribe has asserted a significant level of sovereignty. Due to its status as a "closed reservation", the tribe can assert a considerable amount of control over non-residents, including controlling their movements within the reservation or expelling them altogether. As an example, the tribe has barred journalists from entry on several occasions. The prosecution of crimes is often complex due to issues of jurisdiction, which often have to be clarified on a case-by-case basis. The reservation tribal police have jurisdiction over misdemeanors, but the US government, the Bureau of Indian Affairs (BIA) police, legally has jurisdiction over felonies. The state of Minnesota has no criminal jurisdiction over the reservation.

Political tensions have sometimes erupted into violence. In 1979, during a struggle over leadership, men with rifles attacked the tribal police station, and two teenagers were killed. One shot himself accidentally and the other was accidentally shot while struggling with a companion over control of a weapon. Men burned several buildings, including the home of the tribal chairman. 
The tribe and reservation was the first in the United States to issue its own vehicle license plates as a measure of its sovereign status. It is struggling to find ways to develop its economy. It is collaborating in the 21st century with the White Earth and Leech Lake bands to reach out to the business and academic communities to promote job development. (See "Economy" below.)

The Red Lake shootings occurred on March 21, 2005, in two locations on the reservation.

Demographics

2020 census
As of the census of 2020, the population of the Red Lake Reservation was 5,506. The racial makeup of the reservation was 97.7% Native American, 0.7% White, 0.1% from other races, and 1.4% from two or more races. Ethnically, the population was 1.8% Hispanic or Latino of any race.

Income and health statistics
Per capita income is lower at Red Lake than on any other reservation in the state. It was estimated at US$8,372 in 1999, according to the Northwest Area Foundation. Approximately 40% of residents live below the poverty line. Between 1990 and 2000, the population increased by 40% as people returned to the reservation after difficulty finding employment elsewhere during recession years.

An unemployment rate hovering near 60% and associated poverty are thought to contribute to a high level of crime. In 2004, the tribal police filed 3,500 court cases. The majority of the population is young, with approximately 60% of the residents under the age of 18.

The unemployment and poverty have resulted in associated problems of high rates of violence, including suicide. A 2004 Minnesota School Study found that 43% of boys and 81% of girls in the freshman class of the high school had considered suicide, and 48% of the girls had tried it. The school has a low graduation rate.

Geography
Red Lake Reservation has some widely scattered properties in northwest Minnesota. Most of the Reservation is located around Lower and Upper Red Lake, which is one of the largest lakes in the United States. The land area of the Reservation is located mainly around Lower Red Lake and west of that and Upper Red Lake. The land is covered by prime forest.

Elevation across the Red Lake Reservation is uniform. It ranges in elevation from 1,100 feet above sea level to 1,300 feet above sea level. Besides Lower and Upper Red Lakes, many smaller lakes are scattered across the reservation, especially south of Lower Red Lake.

Communities

The communities of Red Lake Reservation tend to have housing units located on each side of one road, similar to other rural settlements.

Redby has housing units on more cross streets and appears more like a typical town. Yet many of Redby's housing units are located deep in the woods. 
Little Rock
Ponemah
Red Lake
Redby

Climate
Red Lake Reservation has extreme climate conditions. Winters are long and cold, while summers are short and warm. During the winter months of December, January, and February, the average low temperatures at Red Lake are 0, -8, and -3°F. Average high temperatures for the same winter months at Red Lake are 19, 13, and 20°F. Average high temperatures for the summer months of June, July, and August at Red Lake are 73, 78, and 76°F. Average low temperatures for the same summer months at Red Lake are 51, 57, and 54°F.

The lake and forest contribute to significant precipitation at Red Lake,  annually. The large lake has a warming effect, especially in low temperatures. The mild summer low temperatures are a result of the warming effect of Lower and Upper Red Lake. Low temperatures during the summer further south, are cooler, especially at communities that are not located next to lakes.

Economy
Some in the community have expressed hope that renewal of the tribe's traditions and its traditional values may improve life on the reservation. But, others believe that the community needs to focus on education and job development, to employ people and pay them adequately. The majority of jobs on the reservation pay in the vicinity of $7 per hour as of 2005.

The tribe operates three casino operations, which are struggling to generate revenue as they do not allow the sale or consumption of alcohol. A small operation is located in the village of Red Lake, the 13,000-ft² River Road Casino is located seven miles south of Thief River Falls, and the Lake of the Woods Bingo and Casino is in Warroad. Seven Clans Casino Red Lake is located in Red Lake, Minnesota. The three casinos combined are known as Seven Clans Casinos.

Industry on the reservation has consisted primarily of logging and commercial fishing of walleye in the lakes. Walleye production dropped significantly in the 1990s, adding to the reservation's financial problems; a joint effort by Minnesota Department of Natural Resources, the Bureau of Indian Affairs and the Red Lake Band to create a sustainable walleye fishery resulted in a seven-year closure of Red Lake to harvest that ended in 2006 and was followed by stricter regulation. The community receives $50 to $60 million each year in US federal subsidies, such as Social Security and welfare. Because the reservation has few retail businesses and no bank, little money is exchanged within the reservation to help generate more jobs.

The poverty level of the tribe, coupled with financial difficulties in state government, led Minnesota Governor Tim Pawlenty in 2004–2005 to propose a joint casino operation to be co-owned by the White Earth, Leech Lake, and Red Lake bands, and the state government.  The state was willing to designate a site in the populous Twin Cities area, where some of the most successful Indian gaming facilities in the country are located. Many state residents turned against the plan, and it was ruled to be illegal by the state Attorney General Mike Hatch. The Red Lake Band pulled out of negotiations.

Northern Minnesota tribes are working together to stimulate economic development in the region. The Red Lake, Leech Lake and White Earth nations created the Northern Minnesota Tribal Economic Development Commission. They are seeking to make more connections with area businesses and resources. In 2008 the three tribes organized the Northern Minnesota Reservation Economic Development Summit and Trade Show. The White Earth Band is the largest of the six who belong to the Minnesota Chippewa Tribe, to which the Leech Lake Band also belongs.

Government
In 1934, Red Lake rejected organization under the Indian Reorganization Act, as it preferred to retain a clan-based system of governance. The Band did not join the Minnesota Chippewa Tribe, a federally recognized conglomeration of Minnesota's other Chippewa nations, which has its own governing authority.

During the 1950s, governmental reform efforts in Red Lake resulted in the drafting of a tribal constitution.  The constitution established an elected Tribal Council; a group of seven traditionally selected tribal leaders was established to serve on an advisory basis.  Together with the elected council members, these traditional leaders form the Tribal Council's subordinate committees.

In 1959, Roger Jourdain was elected as Red Lake's first chairman; he was successively re-elected until 1990. Jourdain is credited with working to affirm the tribe's sovereignty through negotiations with the state and federal governments, which resulted in Red Lake's continued exemption from Public Law 280.

Jourdain's administration also oversaw the reopening of an Indian Health Service hospital and extensive infrastructure improvements, which focused on running water, housing development, and roads. Jourdain's administration also attracted controversy; in 1979, a two-day riot occurred on the reservation following the Tribal Council's dismissal of its secretary-treasurer.  During the riots, armed protestors attacked the tribal police station and burned fourteen buildings, including Jourdain's home. Two teenagers were killed; one during a struggle over a weapon and the other due to an accidental, self-inflicted wound.

In 1990, Gerald "Butch" Brun unseated Jourdain. Darrell G. Seki, Sr. is the current tribal chairman as of 2022.

Between 2015 and 2020, the Red Lake Nation participated in the Tiwahe Demonstration Project, a pilot for a federal program that provides funding for tribal governments to enhance their self-governance and integrate public services.  Red Lake Nation used this funding in part to  hire a Healing to Wellness Court (HTWC) judge and to improve its family drug courts, which seek to provide alternatives to incarceration and reduce recidivism.

In 2021, the Red Lake Nation received authorization  from the U.S. Environmental Protection Agency to exercise authority over the water quality standards for its tribal surface water.

Education
School systems include:
Red Lake School District
Red Lake Senior High School
Endazhi-Nitaawiging Charter School

Notable tribal members and residents

Donna Bergstrom, retired US Marine Corps officer, ran for the Minnesota Senate in 2016 and as a candidate for Minnesota Lieutenant Governor in the Republican primary of 2018.
 Brenda Child, educator and author, history professor, University of Minnesota. Author of: Boarding School Seasons (2000); Holding Our World Together: Ojibwe Women and the Survival of the Community (2012) 
 Leon F. Cook, president of the National Congress of American Indians from 1971 to 1972.
 Patrick DesJarlait, Red Lake Ojibwe visual artist and graphic designer
 Sam English, painter, activist. Noted fine artist, painter, and activist for various causes, including those of Native American chemical dependency, health, and wellness organizations.
 Adam Fortunate Eagle, Native American political activist.
 Roger Jourdain (1913-2002), elected the first Chairman of the Red Lake Band of Chippewa in 1959, in the tribe's first popular election of leader; served until 1990. He was selected in 1986 as the Indian Man of the Year by the American Indian Heritage Foundation.
 Bill Lawrence (1939-2010), owner-editor of Native American Press/Ojibwe News since 1988
 Medweganoonind, 19th-century Red Lake Ojibwe chief
 Charlie Norris, professional wrestler
 Migizi Pensoneau, television writer
 Gary Sargent (b. 1954), ice hockey player
 Thomas J. Stillday, Jr., spiritual leader of the Red Lake Nation, tribal council member, served as first non-Judeo/Christian Minnesota Senate Chaplain from 1997 to 1998.
 William Whipple Warren, Minnesota territorial legislator (1851-1853) and first Ojibwe historian, wrote a work combining oral history and recognized European-American criteria; his History of the Ojibway People, Based Upon Traditions and Oral Statements (1885), was published posthumously and reprinted in 2009 in an annotated edition

References

External links 

Red Lake Nation
"Tribal Consultation Protocol between the USDA Natural Resources Conservation Service and the Red Lake Band of Minnesota Chippewa", Natural Resources Conservation Service
Archival Images of Red Lake Mission from the Saint Benedict's Monastery Archives

American Indian reservations in Minnesota
Anishinaabe reservations and tribal-areas in the United States
Ojibwe in Minnesota
Native American tribes in Minnesota
Federally recognized tribes in the United States
Populated places in Beltrami County, Minnesota
Populated places in Clearwater County, Minnesota
Populated places in Koochiching County, Minnesota
Populated places in Lake of the Woods County, Minnesota
Populated places in Marshall County, Minnesota
Populated places in Pennington County, Minnesota
Populated places in Polk County, Minnesota
Populated places in Red Lake County, Minnesota
Populated places in Roseau County, Minnesota
Geography of Lake of the Woods County, Minnesota